New York's 14th congressional district is a congressional district for the United States House of Representatives located in New York City, represented by Democrat  Alexandria Ocasio-Cortez.

The district includes the eastern part of The Bronx and part of north-central Queens. The Queens portion includes the neighborhoods of Astoria, College Point, Corona, East Elmhurst, Elmhurst, Jackson Heights, and Woodside. The Bronx portion of the district includes the neighborhoods of City Island, Country Club, Van Nest, Morris Park, Parkchester, Pelham Bay, Schuylerville, and Throggs Neck. Roughly half of the population of the district is of Hispanic or Latino heritage, making it one of the more Latino districts in New York.  Before redistricting for the 2012 election, much of the area was in New York's 7th congressional district.

Voting

History
 1803–1813: 
 1813–1823: Montgomery County
 1823–1913: 
 1913–1945: Parts of Manhattan
 1945–1983: Parts of Brooklyn
 1983–1993: All of Staten Island, Parts of Brooklyn
 1993–2003: Parts of Brooklyn, Manhattan, Queens
 2003–2013: Parts of Manhattan, Queens
 2013–present: Parts of Queens, The Bronx

The district was a Brooklyn-based seat until 1982 when it became the Staten Island district. In 2012, the district shifted to the former territory of the 7th district in Queens and the Bronx. From 2003 to 2013, the district encompassed much of what is now New York's 12th congressional district, including Central Park and the East Side of Manhattan; all of Roosevelt Island; and the neighborhoods of Astoria, Long Island City, and Sunnyside in Queens.

List of members representing the district

Electoral history 
Note that in New York State electoral politics there are numerous minor parties at various points on the political spectrum. Certain parties will invariably endorse either the Republican or Democratic candidate for every office, hence the state electoral results contain both the party votes, and the final candidate votes (Listed as "Recap").

See also

List of United States congressional districts
New York's congressional districts
United States congressional delegations from New York

References

Bibliography

 Congressional Biographical Directory of the United States 1774–present
 2004 House election data Clerk of the House of Representatives
 2002 House election data "
 2000 House election data "
 1998 House election data "
 1996 House election data "

14
Constituencies established in 1803
1803 establishments in New York (state)